Events in the year 1778 in Norway.

Incumbents
Monarch: Christian VII

Events

Arts and literature

 The construction of Stiftsgården was finished.

Births
30 May - Jens Rynning, priest (died 1857)
11 November - Nils Astrup, politician (died 1835)
7 December - Wilhelm Frimann Koren Christie, a Norwegian constitutional father, known for being the constitutional assembly's writer (died 1849)
23 December - Johan Reinhardt, professor in zoology (died 1845)

Full date unknown
Sara Oust, revivalist lay preacher (died 1822)

Deaths

See also